As of 2018, official statistics showed 201,993 Peruvian-born residents in Spain. Out of these, 129,344 were Spanish citizens and 72,649 had not yet acquired Spanish citizenship. As of 2019, the number had increased to 218,129.

Fall in population during the financial crisis
During the financial crisis, the Peruvian community decreased somewhat dramatically. In just one year, the Peruvian population in Spain decreased by 23.76%, a figure that places Peru as the country with the greatest dropout of official residents in that nation. The number went from 109,639 official residents in Spain, as of January 1, 2013, to 83,583, as of January 1, 2014. That is, 26,055 fewer Peruvians among the foreign population in the country, according to information disseminated by the National Institute of Statistics (INEI).

The population has since recovered and increased since the end of the economic downturn.

Notable people

References

Sources

Further reading

External links
Federación de asociaciones peruanos en España

Ethnic groups in Spain
Spain